The Maine is a river, a tributary of the Loire,  long, in the Maine-et-Loire département in France.

It is formed by the confluence of the Mayenne and Sarthe rivers north of Angers. It flows through this city and joins the Loire southwest of Angers.

The river's name is derived from the ancient Meodena, and is unrelated to Maine, the province.

References

Rivers of France
 
Rivers of Maine-et-Loire
Rivers of Pays de la Loire